Tryokhrechny is a rural locality (a khutor) in Khuzhorskoye Rural Settlement of Maykopsky District, Russia. The population was 572 as of 2018. There are 11 streets.

Geography 
Tryokhrechny is located 37 km northeast of Tulsky (the district's administrative centre) by road. Kuzhorskaya is the nearest rural locality.

References 

Rural localities in Maykopsky District